Right to the Heart is a 1942 American comedy film directed by Eugene Forde and written by Walter Bullock.The film stars Brenda Joyce, Joseph Allen, Cobina Wright and Stanley Clements. It is based on a short story by Harold MacGrath, which had been filmed previously as Womanpower in 1926. The film was released on January 23, 1942, by 20th Century Fox.

Plot

John T. Bromley III is a young man from high society who is physically humiliated by a prizefighter before his socialite sweetheart, Jenny Killian. He goes to a training camp to redeem his self-respect and ensure his success in a return engagement with the fighter.

Cast   
Brenda Joyce as Jenny Killian
Joseph Allen as John T. Bromley III 
Cobina Wright as Barbara Paxton 
Stanley Clements as Stash
Don DeFore as Tommy Sands 
Hugh Beaumont as Willie Donovan
Charles D. Brown as Jim Killian
Ethel Griffies as Minerva Bromley
Frank Orth as Pete
Phil Tead as McAllister
William Haade as Morgan
Spencer Charters as Jonah

Production
Cornel Wilde was due to star but fell ill and was replaced by Joseph Allen.

References

External links 
 
 

1942 films
20th Century Fox films
American comedy films
1942 comedy films
Films directed by Eugene Forde
Films scored by Leigh Harline
American black-and-white films
1940s English-language films
1940s American films